Western Transport was a road transport company that commenced operation in 1934  in Toowoomba, Queensland, Australia.

Founder John Cyril Anderson worked in a family grocery store in Toowoomba, and he purchased a two-ton Studebaker truck in 1934 to bring supplies into the store from Brisbane. Eventually this supply run was expanded to a general carry business venture and by 1936 the operation had increased to four vehicles, becoming Western Transport Pty Ltd.

In 1950 Western Transport acquired Maranoa Transport company and greatly expanded their operating area.

In its heyday of the 1950s through to the 1970s, Western Transport operated the largest fleet of trucks in Australia, over 500 trucks and trailers in all. The company serviced every mainland state with depots in Brisbane, Sydney, Melbourne, Adelaide, Perth and Darwin and fifty-three Queensland towns.

Through Western Transport, Cyril Anderson was instrumental in starting up the local truck manufacturing company Leader Trucks, having previously had a large shareholding in Mack Trucks Australia. 

Western Transport, Anderson Agencies, Maranoa Transport, Westco Motors, Great Western, Wesco Truck Sales and Western Oilfields Trucking were all part of the Western Transport organisation.

In 1972 Western Transport was sold to Bell Brothers of Western Australia.

References

External links
Western Transport Museum website

Logistics companies of Australia
Transport companies established in 1934
Transport companies disestablished in 1972
1934 establishments in Australia
Australian companies disestablished in 1972
Australian companies established in 1934